Ogundipe is a surname. Notable people with the surname include:

Babafemi Ogundipe (1924–1971), Nigerian politician
Funsho Ogundipe (born 1968), Nigerian pianist, music director and composer
Isaac O. Ogundipe (born 1948), Nigerian engineer
Molara Ogundipe (born 1940), Nigerian poet, critic and editor
Oluwatoyin Ogundipe (born 1960), Nigerian academic
P. A. Ogundipe (1927-2020), Nigerian educator, civil servant and writer